Crenicichla empheres is a species of cichlid native to South America. It is found in Brazil.

References

Lucena, C.A.S. de, 2007. Two new species of the genus Crenicichla Heckel, 1840 from the upper rio Uruguay drainage (Perciformes: Cichlidae). Neotrop. Ichthyol. 5(4):449-456. 

empheres
Freshwater fish of Brazil
Taxa named by Carlos Alberto Santos de Lucena
Fish described in 2007